Savannah College of Art and Design (SCAD) is a private nonprofit art school with locations in Savannah, Georgia; Atlanta, Georgia; and Lacoste, France.

Founded in 1978 to provide degrees in programs not yet offered in the southeast of the United States, the university now operates two locations in Georgia, a degree-granting online education program, and a study abroad location in Lacoste, France. The university enrolls more than 14,000 students from across the United States and around the world with international students comprising up to 17 percent of the student population. SCAD is accredited by the Southern Association of Colleges and Schools Commission on Colleges and other professional accrediting bodies.

History

Richard G. Rowan, Paula S. Wallace, May L. Poetter and Paul E. Poetter legally incorporated the Savannah College of Art and Design September 29, 1978. In September 1979, the university first began offering classes with four staff members, seven faculty members, and 71 students. Initially, the school offered eight majors: ceramics, graphic design, historic preservation, textile design, interior design, painting, photography, and printmaking. In May 1981, the first graduate received a degree. The following year, the first graduating class received degrees. In 1982, the enrollment grew to more than 500 students, then to 1,000 in 1986, and 2,000 in 1989. In 2014, the university enrolled more than 11,000 students.

In the late 1980s and early 1990s, a rash of faculty suicides prompted a nervous reaction from school administrators. The unrest led a competing art school to open downtown, igniting an "all-out war."

Student unrest grew in the early 1990s regarding student representation within the school, culminating in 1992 with the detonation of an explosive device at the administration building, and two more later that year, at the Savannah Civic Center.

SCAD opened a study abroad location in Lacoste, France in 2002 that provides programming for the various academic departments offered by the university's degree-granting locations. It launched an online learning program in 2003 that U.S. News & World Report ranks as among the best for bachelor's programs in the nation. In 2005 the university opened a location in Midtown Atlanta that merged with the Atlanta College of Art in 2006. In September 2010, SCAD opened a Hong Kong location in the Sham Shui Po district.

Richard Rowan served as president of the college from its inception in 1978 until April 2000, when SCAD's board of trustees promoted him to chancellor. As chancellor, Rowan spent most of his time traveling and recruiting international students and staff. In 2001, he resigned the job and left the college.

Paula S. Wallace is the current president. Wallace, formerly Paula S. Rowan, served as SCAD's provost and dean of academics before becoming president. As president, Wallace directs the internal management of the institution. Wallace has led the collaboration for several annual events, such as the Sidewalk Arts Festival, Savannah Film Festival, a Fashion Show, SCAD Style, deFine Art Festival, Art Educators' Forum and Rising Star. Questions have been raised about the unusual pay packages granted to Wallace and her family.  Paula Wallace received $9.6 million in compensation in 2014, and 13 members of her family have received $60 million over the past 20 years.

The university's second museum, SCAD FASH Museum of Fashion + Film, opened in 2015, at SCAD Atlanta.

In 2018, a student started a petition calling for better mental health services for students after two suicides occurred after the beginning of the 2018 academic year. In 2019, SCAD increased the number of professional counseling staff and created Bee Well, which provides virtual and physical counseling, wellness workshops, and a 24/7 toll-free emotional support hotline.

In March 2020, in response to the COVID-19 pandemic, SCAD transitioned to entirely virtual learning for all students, while allowing international students and others to remain in residence halls following social distancing protocols.

In June 2020, SCAD discontinued studies at its Hong Kong location, citing concerns about student safety and academic quality following the 2019–20 Hong Kong protests and the COVID-19 pandemic. The North Kowloon Magistracy will be returned to the city.

In June 2020, in the midst of Black Lives Matter protests around the U.S., SCAD created an office of inclusion and announced related initiatives to address systemic racism, including the addition of 15 endowed scholarships for black students.

Campus

Facilities
SCAD's efforts to work with the city of Savannah to preserve its architectural heritage include restoring buildings for use as college facilities, for which it has been recognized by the American Institute of Architects, the National Trust for Historic Preservation, the Historic Savannah Foundation and the Victorian Society of America. The college campus includes 67 buildings throughout the grid-and-park system of downtown Savannah. Many buildings are on the 22 squares of the old town, which are laden with monuments, live oaks and a Southern-Gothic feel.

Located in Atlanta's Midtown, SCAD Atlanta includes classroom and exhibition space, computer labs, library, photography darkrooms, printmaking and sculpture studios, a dining hall, fitness center, swimming pool and residence hall. SCAD Atlanta's Ivy Hall (also known as the Edward C. Peters House) opened in 2008 after extensive restoration. In 2009, SCAD Atlanta opened the Digital Media Center.

The SCAD Lacoste campus is made up of 15th- and 16th-century structures. The campus includes an art gallery, guest houses, computer lab and printmaking lab. It is equipped with classrooms, meeting areas, computer labs, an art gallery and library.

The college's first academic building was the Savannah Volunteer Guards Armory, which was purchased and renovated in 1979. Built in 1892, the Romanesque Revival red brick structure is included on the National Register of Historic Places. Originally named Preston Hall, the building was renamed Poetter Hall in honor of co-founders May and Paul Poetter. SCAD soon expanded rapidly, acquiring buildings in Savannah's downtown historic and Victorian districts, restoring old and often derelict buildings that had exhausted their original functions.

The college operates four libraries: Jen Library in Savannah, Georgia; ACA Library in Atlanta, Georgia; Hong Kong Library in Hong Kong; and Lacoste Library in Lacoste, France. There is also a large amount of resources available via the eLearning Library.

The most notable of the group is Jen Library for the size of its collection. The Jen Library houses approximately 42,000 books, 11,000 bound volumes of periodicals, and 1,600 videotapes in an 85,000 square foot building. The building, itself, once served as a Maas Brothers department store before being acquired and repurposed by the university. Its structural and design features include a large glass staircase and floor-to-ceiling windows on opposite corners of the building. The Jen Library houses multiple rare collections containing both books and visual arts materials including the Don Bluth Collection of Animation and the Newton Collection of British and American Art. It is also home to the Gutstein Gallery, an assemblage of contemporary art from both nationally recognized artists as well as SCAD alumni.

In April 2021, the college announced plans of expanding its film and digital media studio, which would make it the largest college movie studio in the country. Plans include a new digital stage and three new soundstages house at a 10.9-acre backlot.

Student housing
In Atlanta, the university provides three residence halls, ACA Residence Hall of SCAD, Brookwood Courtyard, and the Forty. The Hong Kong residence hall is the Hong Kong Gold Coast residences. The residence halls in Savannah are Barnard Village, Boundary Village, Montgomery House, Oglethorpe House, Turner House, Chatham House, Victory Village, and the Hive student housing complex, consisting of Apiary, Bumble, Colony, Dance, Everest, Flower, Garden, and Honey at The Hive. Students in Lacoste live in Maison Pitot, Fortunee, Renard, Murier, Olivier, and Basse.

Museums and galleries
SCAD operates museums, galleries, and exhibition spaces across its campuses, including the SCAD Museum of Art, located on the site of the former Central of Georgia Railway headquarters in Savannah, Georgia, and SCAD FASH Museum of Fashion + Film in Atlanta, Georgia. Rafael Gomes is the director of fashion exhibitions and has curated several shows including ‘Robert Fairer Backstage Pass: Dior, Galliano, Jacobs, and McQueen.'

University galleries include Gutstein Gallery, Pei Ling Chan Gallery, Pinnacle Gallery and La Galerie Bleue in Savannah; Gallery 1600, Trois Gallery and Gallery See in Atlanta; and Moot Gallery in Hong Kong.

Academics
SCAD offers fine art degrees. In Fall 2019, SCAD enrolled more than 14,840 students (12,167 undergraduates; 2,673 postgraduates) from all 50 states, and more than 110 countries. Currently, International student enrollment is 17 percent.

Accreditation
SCAD is accredited by the Commission on Colleges of the Southern Association of Colleges and Schools to award bachelor's and master's degrees. The university confers Bachelor of Arts, Bachelor of Fine Arts, Master of Architecture, Master of Arts, Master of Arts in Teaching, Master of Fine Arts and Master of Urban Design degrees, as well as undergraduate and graduate certificates. The professional M.Arch. degree is accredited by the National Architectural Accrediting Board. The Master of Arts in Teaching degrees offered by SCAD are approved by the Georgia Professional Standards Commission. SCAD is licensed by the South Carolina Commission on Higher Education. The SCAD interior design Bachelor of Fine Arts degree is accredited by the Council for Interior Design Accreditation.

Study abroad
The university offers a study-abroad campus in Lacoste, France. In Fall 2010, SCAD opened SCAD Hong Kong in the former North Kowloon Magistracy.

Schools and departments

The university is divided into nine schools:

School of Building Arts
School of Business Innovation
School of Communication Arts
School of Design
School of Fashion
School of Digital Media
School of Entertainment Arts
School of Fine Arts
School of Liberal Arts

Student activities
There are 80 student organizations related to academic and non-academic programs and activities. SCAD has no fraternities or sororities.

Student media
The university has multiple student-run media organizations at its Savannah and Atlanta locations.

Savannah
District, an online-only news publication, in print from 1995 to 2008
The Manor, an online fashion magazine published since 2014
Port City Review, an annual literary and arts journal published since 2013
The HoneyDripper, a sequential art and illustration blog published since 2016
SCAD Radio, an online webcasting station broadcasting since 2002
Women's Empowerment Club (WEC), discussion based group dedicated to intersectional feminism and social awareness
Atlanta
The Connector, an online-only news publication, in print from 2006 to 2008
SCAN Magazine, a quarterly general interest magazine published since 2009
SCAD Atlanta Radio, an online webcasting station broadcasting since 2007

Athletics

SCAD Savannah Bees

The athletic teams of the SCAD Savannah campus are called the Bees. The college is a member of the National Association of Intercollegiate Athletics (NAIA), primarily competing in the Sun Conference (formerly known as the Florida Sun Conference (FSC) until after the 2007–08 school year) since the 2004–05 academic year; The Bees previously competed as an NAIA Independent during the 2003–04 school year (which they were a member on a previous stint from 1987–88 (when the school began intercollegiate athletics) to 1991–92); as well as a member of the Division III ranks of the National Collegiate Athletic Association (NCAA) as an NCAA D-III Independent from 1992–93 to 2002–03.

SCAD Savannah competes in 22 intercollegiate varsity sports. Men's sports include bowling, cross country, cycling, golf, lacrosse, soccer, swimming, tennis and track & field (indoor and outdoor); while women's sports include bowling, cross country, cycling, golf, lacrosse, soccer, swimming, tennis and track & field (indoor and outdoor); and co-ed sports include equestrian and eSports. Former sports included men's & women's basketball, cheerleading and co-ed fishing.

Club/intramural sports
Fencing is offered as a club sport. Opportunities for athletics participation also exist through the college's intramural programs. Volleyball, beach volleyball, basketball, soccer, flag football, softball and various other activities are available at the intramural level.

NCAA to NAIA
On June 17, 2003, Savannah College of Art and Design executive vice president Brian Murphy and athletic director Jud Damon announced that the university would be changing athletic affiliation from the Division III ranks of the NCAA and re-joining the NAIA. SCAD had been a Division III member since 1992, but would now be joining the Florida Sun Conference. The college was a member of the NAIA from 1987 to 1992 and renewed membership in the NAIA and the FSC (now the Sun Conference) beginning with the 2003–04 season.

SCAD Atlanta Bees

The athletic teams of the SCAD Atlanta campus are likewise called the Bees. The college is a member of the National Association of Intercollegiate Athletics (NAIA), primarily competing in the Appalachian Athletic Conference (AAC) since the 2012–13 academic year; after spending two seasons as an NAIA Independent within the Association of Independent Institutions (AII) from 2010–11 (when the school began intercollegiate athletics and joined the NAIA) to 2011–12.

SCAD Savannah competes in 16 intercollegiate varsity sports. Men's sports include bowling, cross country, cycling, fencing, golf, tennis and track & field (indoor and outdoor); while women's sports include bowling, cross country, cycling, fencing, golf, tennis and track & field (indoor and outdoor).

Origins
In 2010, SCAD Atlanta entered the NAIA in men's and women's golf, men's and women's tennis and men's and women's cross country.

Annual events

Savannah Film Festival
 The college holds numerous lectures, performances and film screenings at two historic theaters it owns, the Trustees Theater and the Lucas Theatre for the Arts. These theaters also are used once a year for the Savannah Film Festival in late October/early November. Past guests of the festival include Roger Ebert, Peter O'Toole, Tommy Lee Jones, Norman Jewison, Ellen Burstyn, Sir Ian McKellen, Oliver Stone, Liam Neeson, James Franco, Sidney Lumet, Miloš Forman, Michael Douglas, Woody Harrelson, John Goodman, Claire Danes, James Gandolfini, Patrick Stewart, Holly Hunter and many others. With average attendance more than 40,000, the event includes a week of lectures, workshops and screenings of student and professional films. There also is a juried competition.

deFINE ART
Founded in 2010, deFINE ART brings leading contemporary artists to Savannah and Atlanta annually in February to present new projects, commissioned works, and new performances. Since 2010, guests have included artists such as Lawrence Weiner, Marilyn Minter, Hank Willis Thomas, Carlos Cruz-Diez, and others.

Sidewalk Arts and Sand Arts Festivals
Each April, SCAD hosts the Sidewalk Arts Festival in downtown Forsyth Park. The festival consists primarily of the chalk-drawing competition, which is divided into group and individual categories of students, alumni and prospective students. Similar is the Sand Arts Festival. This sand festival is held every spring on the beaches of nearby Tybee Island. Contestants can work alone or in groups of up to four people. The competition is divided into sand relief, sand sculpture, sand castle and wind sculpture divisions.

Other events
Individual departments host yearly and quarterly shows to promote student work. Annual festivals such as SCAD AnimationFest, SCAD GamingFest, SCAD aTVfest, and events such as SCAD Style and offer opportunities for networking.

Students also frequent en masse non-SCAD-affiliated events if they are held in the historic district, such as the Savannah Jazz Festival and the St. Patrick's Day celebration.

Controversies

Clarence Thomas Center for Historic Preservation
SCAD has received repeated backlash for naming one of its academic halls after Supreme Court Justice Clarence Thomas. Thomas was born and raised in Savannah, and served as an altar boy at a convent located at 439 East Broad Street. In 2010, the building was acquired by the school and renamed the Clarence Thomas Center for Historic Preservation, with Thomas attending the dedication. Following the renewed interest of the Anita Hill hearings during Brett Kavanaugh’s Supreme Court nomination, several petitions were formed by SCAD students and alumni demanding the school change the building’s name. Despite one petition receiving over 2,000 signatures, SCAD refused to rename the building. Students also launched a petition to keep Thomas’ name on the building, which received over 18,000 signatures. In 2022, in response to the Supreme Court’s decision to overturn Roe v. Wade with the decision of Dobbs v. Jackson Women’s Health Organization, SCAD once again received backlash for the building’s name. Thomas voted to repeal reproductive rights for women, a decision which sparked mass protests across the country and in Savannah. Another petition was started by a SCAD student which amassed over 2,000 signatures. Following this renewed backlash, SCAD removed the sign with Thomas’ name from the building, but issued no statement on the matter.

Impact on Savannah
SCAD has had a significant impact on tourism in Savannah. In a report published by SCAD in 2018 they claim to have generated over $3 billion for the city and attracted 14.5 million visitors. A similar report by SCAD in 2020 claimed that the school’s Atlanta and Savannah campuses brought in $766.2 million in annual economic impact for the state. Yet many Savannah residents and SCAD students have expressed dissatisfaction with SCAD’s growth, specifically in Savannah. SCAD does not pay property taxes in Savannah, and the continued growth of the school’s facilities has raised property taxes in many of Savannah’s lower-income neighborhoods. In 2023, the first large-scale protest against SCAD’s expansion was held by community members at the SCAD Museum of Art in response to SCAD’s continued displacement of black families in Savannah. The school has issued no comment on the matter.

Notable faculty

Notable alumni

References

External links

 
 SCAD Savannah Bees athletics website
 SCAD Atlanta Bees athletics website

 
Art schools in Georgia (U.S. state)
Georgia (U.S. state) culture
Private universities and colleges in Georgia (U.S. state)
Video game universities
Educational institutions established in 1978
Universities and colleges accredited by the Southern Association of Colleges and Schools
Animation schools in the United States
Universities and colleges in Atlanta
Universities and colleges in Savannah, Georgia
Art museums and galleries in Georgia (U.S. state)
Film schools in the United States
1978 establishments in Georgia (U.S. state)